Chorabali may refer to:
 Chorabali (2012 film), a Bangladeshi action thriller film
 Chorabali (2016 film), a Bengali suspense thriller film